The men's singles badminton event at the 2022 Commonwealth Games was held from 3 to 8 August 2022 at the National Exhibition Centre on the Solihull, England. The defending gold medalist was Lee Chong Wei of Malaysia, who retired in 2019. 

The athletes were drawn into straight knockout stage. The draw for the competition was conducted on 28 July 2022.

Seeds 
The seeds for the tournament were:

  (quarter-finals)
  (champion, Gold medalist)
  (semi-finals, Bronze medalist)
   (second round)

  (final, silver medalist)
  (quarter-finals)
   (semi-finals, Fourth place)
  (quarter-finals)

Results

Finals

Top half

Section 1

Section 2

Bottom half

Section 3

Section 4

References 

Men's singles